Parliamentary elections were held in the People's Republic of the Congo on 8 July 1979, concurrent with a constitutional referendum. The country was a one-party state at the time, with the Congolese Party of Labour as the sole legal party. As such, it won all 153 seats in the enlarged People's National Assembly, with a voter turnout of 90.3%.

Only 153 candidates were put forward for the election, of which 69 were party representatives, 36 were from mass organisations, 20 represented regions and Brazzaville, 18 were workers, and 10 were members of the armed forces.

Results

References

Elections in the Republic of the Congo
Congo
1979 in the Republic of the Congo
One-party elections
Single-candidate elections
July 1979 events in Africa